Sir George McLean (1834 – 17 February 1917) was a 19th-century Member of Parliament from the Otago region in New Zealand.

Biography

McLean owned Matanaka Farm near Waikouaiti from February 1878 until 1892.

McLean held several ministerial appointments under Vogel and Atkinson:  Postmaster-General and Commissioner of Telegraphs from 1 to 13 September  1876 and 12 January to 13 October 1877. He was Collector of Customs from 1 September 1876 to 13 October 1877 and (as a MLC) Commissioner of Trade and Customs from 28 August to 3 September 1884.

On 19 December 1881, he was appointed to the New Zealand Legislative Council and remained a member until his death on 17 February 1917.

He was knighted in 1909. He had married a daughter of Matthew Holmes. His daughter Georgia Constance McLean married Thomas Wilford in 1892.

References

|-

1834 births
1917 deaths
Members of the New Zealand House of Representatives
New Zealand Knights Bachelor
New Zealand MPs for Dunedin electorates
Members of the New Zealand Legislative Council
Members of the Cabinet of New Zealand
19th-century New Zealand politicians
People from Waikouaiti